Operation Lucifer is an adventure published by Timeline in 1982 for the post-apocalyptic role-playing game The Morrow Project.

Plot summary
In The Morrow Project, teams of volunteers have been cryonically frozen in hidden bunkers called boltholes in order to survive an expected nuclear holocaust, with the intention that they rebuild civilization when they emerge. In Operation Lucifer,  Morrow Recon Team G-5 in Wisconsin is awakened by the US strategic defense computer Damocles to find and disarm an unexploded thermonuclear warhead. The team have to survive encounters with an armed militia and somehow infiltrate a religious cult in order to reach the warhead.

Publication history
Timeline published The Morrow Project in 1980, and between 1981 and 2013, published eleven adventures, as well as several supplements. The third adventure, Operation Lucifer, is a 36-page book written and illustrated by  H.N. Voss and published in 1982.

Reception
Chris Baylis reviewed R-003 Operation Lucifer for Imagine magazine, and stated that "The vital part of all these scenarios is the interaction with the NPCs, and this suffers for the want of better ones."

In Issue 72 of The Space Gamer, William A. Barton commented that "Operation Lucifer is a competent adventure for The Morrow Project and should provide [the gamemaster|Project Director] and players with a challenging – and potentially hazardous – game mission."

Guide du Rôliste Galactique called this "a classic" compared to the other more combat-oriented Morrow Project adventures.

Reviews
Different Worlds #46

References

Role-playing game supplements introduced in 1982
The Morrow Project adventures